Pakistanis in the United Arab Emirates include expatriates from Pakistan who have settled in the United Arab Emirates (UAE), With a population of over 1.5 million, Pakistanis are the second largest national group in the UAE after Indians, constituting 12.5% of the country's total population. They are the third largest overseas Pakistani community, behind the Pakistani diaspora in Saudi Arabia and the United Kingdom. The population is diverse and consists of people from all over Pakistan, including Punjab, Sindh, Khyber Pakhtunkhwa and FATA, Balochistan, Azad Kashmir and Gilgit Baltistan. The majority of Pakistanis are Muslim, with significant minorities of Christians, Hindus and other religions. The majority are found in Dubai and Abu Dhabi respectively, while a significant population is spread out in Sharjah and the remaining Northern Emirates. Dubai alone accounts for a Pakistani population of 400,000.

Background

From the time when heavy Pakistani migration occurred to the Middle East, a number of Pakistanis went to the United Arab Emirates. While many tend to be skilled and semi-skilled professionals, most are unskilled migrant workers. Pakistanis outnumber Emirati nationals in three of UAE's emirates: Dubai, Sharjah and Ajman.

Demographics

Pakistani ethnic groups with significant populations include Punjabis, Pashtuns, Sindhis, Baloch, Muhajirs and smaller populations of Saraikis, Kashmiris, Hindkowans and other ethnic groups. There are also smaller populations of Pakistani expatriates from other countries who live and work in the UAE, such as British Pakistanis and Pakistani Canadians.

Economic contribution
Pakistan and the United Arab Emirates maintain strong economic relations with each other, with the UAE being the second biggest trading partner of Pakistan in terms of bilateral trade. A large skilled and semi-skilled Pakistani workforce contributes to the UAE economy. Around 20% of Pakistanis are white-collar professions, and the remaining 80% are involved in the blue-collar industry. The ratio of blue-collar Pakistani labour migrating to the UAE has dropped since 2008, although the volume of remittances has increased. Pakistan ranks among the top five sources of migrant professionals in the UAE. The United Arab Emirates is a major investment destination for Pakistan. Pakistanis are among the top ten investors in the UAE property market, ranking as the second largest nationality that bought most property in Dubai. Many wealthy Pakistanis have bought expensive properties in Dubai and have second homes there. Pakistani expatriates in the UAE are actively involved in the country's business, investment and services sectors. The UAE is the second largest source of remittances to Pakistan; in 2012, remittances from the UAE amounted to $2.9 billion.

Pakistani Professionals 

Pakistanis in UAE dominate the transport sector i.e. from logistics to crane operators and up to taxi drivers. There are many Pakistani bankers working in various local and multinational banks. It is not uncommon to find Pakistani Professionals working in various Multinationals in UAE. There are many Pakistani restaurants in UAE owned and run by these expatriate Pakistanis.

Community Representation 

There are number of organisations which represent Pakistanis in UAE. Some of them are as follows:
 Pakistan Business Council (PBC)
 Pakistan Association of Dubai (PAD)
 Pakistan Professional Wing (PPW)
 Institute of Chartered Accountants of Pakistan (ICAP)- UAE Chapter Wing
 Institute of Business Administration (IBA) Alumni - UAE Chapter

Culture
The Pakistani community in the UAE celebrates Independence Day with much fervour. Urdu, being the national language of Pakistan, is a principal language of the community.

See also
 Pakistan – United Arab Emirates relations
 Embassy of Pakistan, Abu Dhabi
 Consulate-General of Pakistan, Dubai
 Overseas Pakistani

Sources

https://web.archive.org/web/20100419172840/http://www.ycpdubai.com/
http://www.iba.edu.pk
https://web.archive.org/web/20110203100802/http://pakassociationdubai.com/
 Finding love can be hard for Pakistani singles in the UAE
 Pakistani expats in Dubai
 Pakistan expatriates to be given help hotline in coming weeks
 Lowest tuition fees in UAE, so Pakistani school needs help
 Around 20,000 Pakistani children in the UAE don’t go to school
 Pakistanis share 8pc in Dubai property market
 Pakistanis buy Dubai property worth $379m in three months
 http://www.naiglobal.com/agents/Waleed_Murrawat1
 http://www.naisaudiarabia.com/about-nai/leadership

 
Asian diaspora in the United Arab Emirates
Pakistan–United Arab Emirates relations